Tupeni Lebaivalu Baba is a Fijian academic and politician, who founded the now-defunct New Labour Unity Party. Most members of this party later merged with several other centrist parties to form the Fiji Democratic Party (now part of the National Alliance Party). A former professor of education at the University of the South Pacific (USP), he later served as a senior research fellow at the Centre for Pacific Studies at the University of Auckland in New Zealand, from 2001 to the end of 2005. In the general election scheduled for 6–13 May 2006, Baba attempted a political comeback, this time on the ticket of the ruling Soqosoqo Duavata ni Lewenivanua (SDL), a political switch that generated a considerable degree of public discussion. Although his bid was unsuccessful, he was subsequently appointed to the Senate as one of nine nominees of the Fijian government.

Political career 

Baba was a founding member of the Fiji Labour Party in the mid-1980s and was elected in 1987 to the House of Representatives as a candidate of the Labour-National Federation Party Coalition, which brought Timoci Bavadra to power. A month later, the new government was deposed in a coup led by Lieutenant Colonel Sitiveni Rabuka. Baba returned to his academic career, taking a post as a lecturer at the University of Suva, where he remained until 1999, when he was again elected to Parliament and became Foreign Minister and one of two Deputy Prime Ministers in the government of Mahendra Chaudhry. During the coup of 2000 in which most members of the government were kidnapped by George Speight, Baba's courage as one of the hostages earned him considerable public respect.

Baba launched the NLUP in June 2001 after resigning from the Fiji Labour Party (FLP) of former Prime Minister Mahendra Chaudhry, who had been deposed in the Fiji coup of 2000. The breach followed months of intra-party infighting, much of which preceded the coup. Large numbers of anti-Chaudhry dissidents followed him out of the party into the New Labour Unity Party. Baba's departure was thought to be one of the reasons why the Labour Party lost the elections held to restore democracy in September 2001; its share of the vote among ethnic Fijians dropped to around two percent. Baba's NLUP captured two seats, although Baba himself was not elected. During the campaign, he called on the electorate not to support his former party, warning that a return to a government led by Chaudhry could result in another coup. For this, he was accused of fear-mongering.

Life outside politics 
Baba waited until 2005 to reiterate and clarify his reasons for leaving the Labour Party. It was no longer the party he had joined under the leadership of Timoci Bavadra in the 1980s, he said on 18 September 2005. Bavadra's vision had been of a multiracial Fiji, but the present leadership of the party could not see past ethnic boundaries. All that was left of Bavadra's party was the name, he said. He expressed disappointment at Chaudhry's failure as Leader of the Opposition to work with Prime Minister Laisenia Qarase on matters of national importance, saying that when the party negotiated with the government at all, it appeared more like a trade union than a political party. In a multiethnic country like Fiji, Baba said, it was imperative that leaders look beyond ethnic boundaries.

On 22 December 2005, Baba said that he would pursue academic and consultancy work after completing his four-year contract at the University of Auckland, which expired at the end of 2005. He was happy to be away from politics, he said, and was not inclined to return to it. He found recent political trends in Fiji depressing, especially the polarization of political parties on ethnic lines. Questioned again by the Fiji Village news service on 16 February, after his return to Fiji, he refused to be drawn on whether he would contest the 2006 election or not, but made it clear that he was no longer affiliated with the FLP.

Speight of Violence 
On 15 May 2005, the publication of "Speight of Violence," coauthored by Baba, his wife Unaisi Nabobo-Baba (a fellow USP academic (at the time) now (2011) of the University of Guam) and journalist Michael Field, generated controversy with the claim that Mahendra Chaudhry had promised him the Prime Ministership before and during the 1999 election campaign, and that Chaudhry had reneged on that promise. Chaudhry reacted strongly to the allegation, saying that no such promise was or would have been made. An FLP press release called Baba was "a frustrated and embitterered" person who had left the Labour Party after a failed bid for the leadership. "Speight of Violence" is based largely on a diary that Baba claims to have compiled secretly while held hostage by Speight's loyalists, but also gives background information, from Baba's perspective, on political events up to and following the coup.

SDL convert, 2006 
The Fiji Times reported on 11 March 2006 that the ruling SDL had approached Baba with an invitation to contest the parliamentary election scheduled for 6–13 May under the SDL banner. On 18 March, the SDL announced that Baba had been approved as its candidate for the Tamavua Samabula Open Constituency. Fiji Village quoted Baba as saying that his decision to join the SDL was motivated by what he called the lack of leadership in the FLP.

FLP politicians, however, poured derision on the move. Leader Mahendra Chaudhry said that Baba was a deserter, and that the SDL must be "hard up for candidates" to have selected a man like him, while Deputy Leader Poseci Bune told the Fiji Sun that he was baffled by the turn of events. "He used to be a liberal left winger but now he is back to nationalist. SDL must be desperate for candidates," he surmised. Soqosoqo ni Vakavulewa ni Taukei (SVT) General Secretary Ema Druavesi also expressed disappointment with Baba's decision, saying he had joined a party lacking "the character of a good leadership."

The Fiji Times quoted Baba on 20 March as saying that the SDL was "the only alternative for Fiji moving forward." He praised its success in reviving the economy; he conceded that some of its legislation was controversial, but saw it as an attempt to move the country forward. He still considered himself a liberal and a socialist, he said, but insisted that had to be seen in the multiracial context of Fiji. His former party, the FLP, gave mere lip service to multiracialism, he charged. "I have responded to the request of the SDL party according to the mood of politics because I am fed up of confrontational and negative politics," he said.

The 2006 coup d'état 

Towards the end of 2006, the Fijian government announced that Baba would be its next Ambassador to the United Nations.  This plan was aborted, however, by a military coup on 5 December.  The Military later announced that Baba might face investigation for his alleged links to international fraudster Peter Foster.

Return to politics 

Baba helped to found the Social Democratic Liberal Party (SDLP) as the successor party to the SDL, which the Military-backed interim government had dissolved. He briefly led the party in 2014, but made way for Ro Teimumu Kepa, a high chief and former Cabinet Minister. He was not a candidate in the general elections held in 2014.

Personal life 

Dr Tupeni Baba is married to associate professor of education Dr Unaisi Nabobo-Baba of the University of Guam.  Together they have one son only.  Previously, Baba had a son, Viliame, and a daughter, Raijeli, with his first wife, Miriama Raitasia Cagilaba, a native of Natewa in Cakaudrove Province. Miriama is the younger sister of Lady Bale Ganilau, the wife of former Governor-General and first President, Ratu Sir Penaia Ganilau. In 2002, Raijeli married the then-Chief Justice, Sir Timoci Tuivaga.  A lawyer, Raijeli continues to work in the law and runs her own practice in Suva.
 
Baba is related to Sitiveni Rabuka, who deposed the 1987 government in which he served.

Fiji Labour Party politicians
I-Taukei Fijian members of the Senate (Fiji)
I-Taukei Fijian members of the House of Representatives (Fiji)
Fijian Methodists
Living people
Soqosoqo Duavata ni Lewenivanua politicians
People educated at Lelean Memorial School
Academic staff of the University of Auckland
Year of birth missing (living people)
Social Democratic Liberal Party politicians
Foreign Ministers of Fiji
New Labour Unity Party politicians
Politicians from Cakaudrove Province